Matt Platkin (born 1986/1987) is an American attorney serving as the Attorney General of the State of New Jersey.

Early life and career
A resident of Montclair, New Jersey, Platkin was raised in Florham Park, New Jersey and Morristown, New Jersey. He attended Madison High School, earned his undergraduate degree from Stanford University and earned a Juris Doctor from Stanford Law School. He started his career with the Brookings Institution, advising Congress on economic recovery after the 2008 financial crisis.

Platkin served as Chief Counsel to Governor Murphy from January 2018 to October 2020. During the COVID-19 pandemic, he drafted executive orders and workforce policies for state government employees. He took a leave during January 2020 to serve as Senator Cory Booker's special counsel during the first impeachment of Donald Trump.

Attorney general
On February 3, 2022, Governor Phil Murphy announced that he was appointing Platkin to serve as Acting Attorney General. Platkin assumed office on February 14, 2022, succeeding Andrew Bruck as Acting Attorney General. He assumed the position in full on September 29, 2022, after the confirmation of his appointment by the New Jersey State Senate.

Personal life
Platkin and his wife, Sophia, live in Montclair with their son, Robert.

References

1980s births
Living people
Madison High School (New Jersey) alumni
New Jersey Attorneys General
New Jersey Democrats
New Jersey lawyers
People from Florham Park, New Jersey
People from Montclair, New Jersey
People from Morristown, New Jersey
Stanford Law School alumni